

Events and publications

January
 January 3: The first episode of Bunny Matthews' comic series Vic and Nat'ly appears in print. The series will run until 2005. 
 29-31 January: During the Angoulême International Comics Festival, Claire Bretécher becomes the first woman to win the Grand Prix de la ville d'Angoulême.
 Warren Publishing suspends publication.
DC Comics Presents #41 features an insert previewing the new Wonder Woman creative team of writer Roy Thomas and artist Gene Colan as well as an update of the character's costume.
 House of Mystery #300: "Special Thrill-Filled 300th Issue," edited by Karen Berger. (DC Comics)
 Phantom Zone #1 (of a four-issue limited series), by Steve Gerber, Gene Colan, and Tony DeZuniga; published by DC Comics.
 Marvel Super-Heroes (1967 series), with issue #105, cancelled by Marvel.
 "Apocalypse War" Judge Dredd storyline begins in 2000 AD. (continues through July)
 The seventh issue of Jan Bucquoy's Belgian adult comics magazine Spetters focuses on Hergé in a direct reaction to the trial against Filip Denis' porn parody Tintin in Switzerland. The entire issue is deliberately made to offend Hergé in the crudest possible way and to defend the freedom of speech. This is a turning point in the career of Bucquoy, who will focus more and more on provocative stunts.

February
The Flash #306 began a Doctor Fate backup series by writer Martin Pasko and artist Keith Giffen which ran through issue #313. 
The New Teen Titans #16 features an insert previewing  the upcoming Captain Carrot and His Amazing Zoo Crew! series by Roy Thomas and Scott Shaw.
 Savage She-Hulk, with issue #25, is cancelled by Marvel.
 The final issue of Jan Bucquoy's Belgian adult comics magazine Spetters is published.

March
 March 1: In À Suivre, the first chapter of It Was the War of the Trenches by Jacques Tardi is published.
 The debut of Alan Moore's new, darker Marvelman in Warrior #1.
 The debut of Alan Moore and David Lloyd's V for Vendetta in Warrior #1.
 Justice League of America #200: 76-page anniversary issue, "A League Divided". The double-sized issue was a "jam" featuring a story written by Gerry Conway, a framing sequence drawn by George Pérez, and chapters drawn by Pat Broderick, Jim Aparo, Dick Giordano, Gil Kane, Carmine Infantino, Brian Bolland, and Joe Kubert.  Bolland's chapter gave the artist his "first stab at drawing Batman."
 DC's horror-suspense anthology Secrets of Haunted House ceases publication with issue #46.
 Flash Gordon (1966 series), with issue #37, is cancelled by the Gold Key Comics imprint Whitman Comics.
 March 27: Britain's weekly Eagle comic relaunched by IPC Media in a mostly photonovel format.

April
 April 25: The final episode of Vahan Shirvanian's No Comment is published.
 Daredevil #181 — Bullseye fatally stabs Elektra.
 The long-running British series The Trigan Empire ceases publication with the cancellation of Look and Learn with issue #1042.
In the Brazilian magazine Tio Patinhas, O Furacão Branco e Preto, by Gérson Luiz Borlotti Teixeira and Irineu Soares Rodrigues; debut of Biquinho, the Fethry Duck’s nephew.

May
 May 2: 
 The final episode of Frank O'Neal's Short Ribs is published.
 Marten Toonder is named Officer in the Order of Orange-Nassau.
 May 3: In a Frank and Ernest gag by Bob Thaves a line about Hollywood actor Ginger Rogers' dance talent is published (She did everything he did, backwards and in high heels). The quote will eventually become one of the most often repeated descriptions about Rogers in non-fiction publications.
 To help raise money for his lawsuit against Marvel Comics for ownership of Howard the Duck, Steve Gerber brings out his own Destroyer Duck from Eclipse Comics.
 Fantastic Four Roast a one-shot written by Fred Hembeck is published by Marvel Comics.  
 DC's long-running weird/horror anthology The Unexpected ceases publication with issue #222.
 Ghosts, with issue #112, is cancelled by DC.
 The Many Ghosts of Doctor Graves, with issue #72, is cancelled for the second time by Charlton.

June
 The first issue of the French comics magazine Psikopat is published. It will run until 2019.
Fantagraphics publishes the Hernandez brothers (Jaime and Gilbert)'s Love & Rockets anthology.
 Marvel begins publishing the Hasbro-licensed series G.I. Joe: A Real American Hero, which would sell over 200,000 copies and out-sell Superman and the X-Men.
 Marvel Super Hero Contest of Champions #1 (of a three-issue limited series), by Mark Gruenwald, John Romita, Jr., and Bob Layton; published by Marvel Comics.
 The two-issue "Nothing Can Stop the Juggernaut!" storyline by creative team Roger Stern, John Romita, Jr., and Jim Mooney begins in The Amazing Spider-Man #229.
 Silver Surfer one-shot scripted by Stan Lee, plotted and penciled by John Byrne, and inked by Tom Palmer is published by Marvel Comics.

July
July 11: In Topolino, The Case of the Circulating Saucer, by Carlo Chendi e Giorgio Cavazzano; debut of  Humphrey Gokart.
The New Teen Titans #21 features an insert previewing the upcoming Night Force series by Marv Wolfman and Gene Colan.
 The Penguin Books imprint Plume releases Creepshow, a graphic novella based on the 1982 horror movie Creepshow.
 The Marvel UK storyline "Jaspers' Warp" (also known as "Crooked World") begins in Marvel Superheroes #387 (continuing through June 1984 in Mighty World of Marvel)

August
 August 1: The first episode of Tom Armstrong's Marvin is published.
 August 2: In Montréal, Canada, comics store Komico is opened.
 The Legion of Super-Heroes storyline "The Great Darkness Saga" begins with issue #290  (runs through December).
 Marvel Superheroes, with issue #388, is cancelled by Marvel UK; it replaced in all but name by The Mighty World of Marvel.
 The first episode of Massimo Mattioli's Squeak the Mouse is published.

September
 September 17: Marten Toonder wins the Stripschapprijs. The Jaarprijs voor Bijzondere Verdiensten (nowadays the P. Hans Frankfurtherprijs) is given to Nico Noordermeer.
 Marvel's Wolverine four-issue mini-series, by Chris Claremont and Frank Miller, begins.
 Marvel's Hercules: Prince of Power four-issue mini-series, by Bob Layton, begins.
 The Marvel/DC intercompany crossover The Uncanny X-Men and The New Teen Titans, by Chris Claremont, Walt Simonson, and Terry Austin.

October
 Norristown, Pennsylvania-based Comico begins publishing with the release of the black-and-white anthology title Primer #1.
 With issue #251, DC again revives Blackhawk volume 1, which ran from 1944 to 1968, and then from 1976 to 1977.
 Josie and the Pussycats (1963 series) is cancelled by Archie Comics with issue #106.
 Justice League of America #207 and All-Star Squadron #14 feature the beginning of the "Crisis on Earth-Prime" crossover between the two titles.  The storyline continues into Justice League of America #208 and All-Star Squadron #15 in November and concludes in Justice League of America #209 in December.
October 10 - Illustrator Ben Krefta is born

November
 November 8: The first episode of Bill Schorr's Conrad is published. It will run until 1986.
Jim Starlin's Dreadstar, the first title published by Marvel's creator-owned imprint Epic Comics, begins.
 Canadian publisher Vortex Comics makes its entrée into the comics world with its anthology Vortex
 Marvel's The Vision and the Scarlet Witch four-issue mini-series, by Bill Mantlo, Rick Leonardi, Ian Akin and Brian Garvey, begins.

December
 December 2: Pierre Makyo and Alain Dodier's Jérôme K. Jérôme Bloche debuts in Spirou.
 December 13: Kevin McCormick's Arnold makes its debut.
 December 20: Katsuhiro Otomo's Akira debuts in Young Magazine
DC publishes its first tailored direct market offering: the first of 12 issues of Camelot 3000, Mike W. Barr & Brian Bolland's future-set tale of King Arthur. It is widely recognized as the first "maxi-series".
 Detective Comics #521: Green Arrow becomes the backup feature.
 DC publishes the first issue of its three-issue Masters of the Universe mini-series
 Charlton Bullseye, with issue #10, canceled by Charlton.

Specific date unknown
 San Diego-based independent publisher Pacific Comics makes a strong push in the marketplace, following Jack Kirby's Captain Victory and the Galactic Rangers with four new ongoing titles, Starslayer, Ms. Mystic, Twisted Tales, and Alien Worlds, featuring such established talents as Neal Adams and Mike Grell.
 To stem the flow of creators defecting to companies such as First Comics, Pacific Comics, and Eclipse Comics, DC Comics begins offering royalties to artists and writers of regular newsstand comics that sell more than 100,000 copies; Marvel soon follows suit with its creator-owned imprint Epic Comics. Launched by editor-in-chief Jim Shooter as a spin-off of the successful Epic Illustrated magazine, the Epic imprint allows creators to retain control and ownership of their properties. Co-edited by Al Milgrom and Archie Goodwin, the imprint also allows Marvel to publish a mature line of comics oriented toward an older audience. Epic titles are printed on higher quality paper than typical Marvel comics, and are only available via the direct market.
 Marvel debuts its Marvel Graphic Novels series, releasing five trade paperbacks over the course of the year: The Death of Captain Marvel, Elric: The Dreaming City, Dreadstar, The New Mutants, and X-Men: God Loves, Man Kills.
 Marvel publishes its first limited series titles: Marvel Super Hero Contest of Champions, Wolverine, Hercules: Prince of Power, and The Vision and the Scarlet Witch.
 After 41 years as a publisher, Harvey Comics ceases publishing.
 After ten years as a publisher, Spire Christian Comics ceases publishing original titles.
 Attempting to create synthesis for two Warner Communications subsidiaries, DC Comics teams up with  Atari Inc. to publish Atari Force, storylines for Atari home console games. The comics are packed in with the games Defender, Berzerk, Star Raiders, Phoenix, and Galaxian.
 DC cancels its last three suspense/horror anthologies, The Unexpected, Ghosts, and Secrets of Haunted House.
 With the demise of New Media/Irjax, Steve Geppi takes over their warehouses and distribution centers and founds Diamond Comic Distributors; 14 years later the company would become the sole major comics distributor
 Independent publisher Paragon Publications changes its name to Americomics.
 Eric Schreurs' Joop Klepzeiker makes its debut in De Nieuwe Revu.

Exhibitions and shows
 September 17–October 9: Chester Gould's Dick Tracy, Graham Gallery, New York City — curated by Georgia Riley
 October 18–31: Marvel Art Exhibition (Institute of Contemporary Arts, London, England) — exhibition of original artwork by artists for Marvel Comics

Conventions
 Katy-Kon 2 (Modesto, California) — 2nd convention dedicated to Katy Keene
 March 27–28: Dimension Convention (Statler Hotel, New York City) — dedicated to the artists and writers who created EC Comics
 June: Heroes Convention (Charlotte, North Carolina) — First annual staging of the multigenre convention. Official guests: George Pérez, Marv Wolfman, Mike Zeck, Butch Guice, Romeo Tanghal
 June 5–6: Colorado Comic Art Convention II (Rocky Mountain School of Art, Denver, Colorado) — guests include Jim Payne, Michael Golden, and Bob Layton
 June 10–13: Fantasy Fair (Dallas, Texas) — inaugural show; guest: Philip José Farmer

 July 3–5: Comic Art Convention (Sheraton Hotel, New York City) — admission: $7/day; $15/weekend
 July 8–11: San Diego Comic-Con (Convention and Performing Arts Center and Hotel, San Diego, California) — 5,000 attendees; official guests: Carl Barks, Terry Beatty, Brian Bolland, Max Allan Collins, Will Eisner, Mike Grell, Chuck Jones, Hank Ketcham, Walter Koenig, Frank Miller, Arn Saba, Leonard Starr, Ken Steacy, Robert Williams
 July 10–11: Creation St. Louis (Bel-Air Hilton, St. Louis, Missouri) — guests include Michael Golden, Brent Anderson, and Tim Conrad
 July 16–18: Chicago Comicon (Americana-Congress Hotel, 520 S. Michigan Ave., Chicago, Illinois)
 July 24–25: Creation Washington, D.C. (Crystal Gateway Marriott, Arlington, Virginia) — affiliated with Geppi's Comic World
 August 13–15: Atlanta Fantasy Fair (Omni Hotel & Georgia World Congress Center, Atlanta, Georgia) — official guests include Frank Miller, Ray Harryhausen, Will Eisner, Philip Jose Farmer, Forrest J Ackerman, Bob Burden, Mike W. Barr, Dick Giordano, Brad Linaweaver, Somtow Sucharitkul, Len Wein, and musical guests Axis
 August 14–15: Creation Pittsburgh (Hyatt at Chatham Center, Pittsburgh, Pennsylvania) — guests include Josef Rubinstein and Mike W. Barr
 August 21–22: Creation Anaheim (Disneyland Hotel, Anaheim, CA) — guests include George Pérez and Michael Golden
 August 28–29: Creation New York (Statler Hilton Hotel, New York City) — guests include Frank Miller, John Byrne, Jack Kirby, Bill Sienkiewicz
 September: OrlandoCon (Orlando, Florida) — guests include C. C. Beck
 September 11–12: Creation Houston (Dunfey Houston Hotel, Houston, TX) — guests include Chris Claremont, Michael Golden, and David Prowse
 September 25–26: Comicana 82 (Regent Crest Hotel, London, England, UK) — produced by Fantasy Domain and Comic Showcase; special guest Frank Miller
 October: Minneapolis Comic-Con (Minneapolis, Minnesota) — guests & attendees include C. C. Beck, Joe Staton, Carol Kalish, Chris Claremont, Denis Kitchen, Joel Thingvall, Catherine Yronwode, Greg Howard, and Reed Waller
 October 23–24: Encounter 6 (Hilton Inn East, Wichita, Kansas)
 November: Mid-Ohio Con (Mansfield, Ohio)

Births

Deaths

January
 January 2: Fred Harman, American comics artist (Bronc Peeler, Red Ryder), passes away at age 79.
 January 8: Ray Thompson, American comics artist and illustrator (The Dubble Bubble Kids), dies at the age of 76.
 January 13: Walter Pogge van Ranken, German novelist and comics writer (Tipp & Tapp ), dies at age 68.
 January 15: Wally Bishop, American cartoonist (Muggs and Skeeter), dies at age 77.
 January 19: 
 Harry Hanan, British comic artist (Louie), dies at age 65. 
 Charles Plumb, American comics artist (Ella Cinders, Chris Crusty), dies at age 81.
 January 29: John Liney, American comics artist (continued Henry), dies at age 69 or 70.

February
 February 3: Arent Christensen, Norwegian comics artist (adventure and science fiction comics based on Christian Haugen's novels), dies at age 87.
 February 13: Gluyas Williams, American comics artist (made cartoons and pantomime comics for The New Yorker), dies at age 93.
 February 18: Jan Rot, Dutch illustrator, caricaturist, songwriter, poster, advertising and comics artist, dies at age 89.
 February 27: Carlo Bisi, Italian comics artist (Sor Pampurio), dies at age 91.

March
 March 28: Dave Sheridan, American comics artist (Tales from the Leather Nun, co-worked on The Fabulous Furry Freak Brothers), dies at age 38 or 39.

April
 April 2: Birger Malmborg, Swedish comics artist and cartoonist (Götlund), dies at age 72.
 April 13: Sam Glankoff, aka Glan, American comics artist (How Do You Handle It?), dies at age 87.
 April 23: Georges Beuville, French illustrator and comics artist (comics based on classic adventure novels), dies at age 80.

May
 May 11: Jan Dirk van Exter, Dutch comics artist (Jan Kordaat, Brommy and Tommy), dies at age 66.
 May 27: Joke, Belgian cartoonist (worked on the comic series Jan Zonder Vrees), dies at age 47 from cancer.

June
 June 4: Henning Dahl Mikkelsen, aka Mik, Danish comics artist (Ferd'nand), dies at age 67 from a heart attack.
 June 10: Karel Links, Dutch illustrator and comics artist (Moffenspiegel, Het is niet waar... dat hebben we niet gewild!), dies at age 66.
 June 30: Abner Dean, American cartoonist, illustrator and comics artist (published in The New Yorker and Life), dies at age 72.

July
 July 2: Jack Bogle, American animator and comics artist (Felix the Cat comics, Ozzy And His Gym, Dell Comics), dies at age 81.
 July 6: Warren Tufts, American comics artist (Casey Ruggles, Lance) and animator, dies at the age of 56.
 July 8: Sylvan Byck, American comics editor (King Features), dies at age 77. 
 July 9: Jehan Sennep, French illustrator, caricaturist, journalist and occasional comics artist, passes away at age 88.
 July 25: Harold Foster, American comics artist (Prince Valiant, Tarzan) dies at the age of 89.

August
 August 15: Ernie Bushmiller, American comics artist (Nancy, continued Fritzi Ritz), dies at age 76.
 August 18: Carlos Botelho, Portuguese painter, illustrator, caricaturist and comics artist (Punchos de Bronze , Les Aventuras do Zuncha, artista de Circo, Ecos da Semana), dies at age 82.

September
 September 7: José Cabrero Arnal, Spanish-French comics artist (Pif le chien, Placid et Muzo), dies at the age of 73. 
 September 12: Gian Giacomo Dalmasso, Italian comics writer (Pantera Bionda), dies at age 75. 
 September 13: Reed Crandall, American comics artist (Blackhawk and EC Comics), dies at age 65.
 September 16: Courtney Dunkel, American comics artist (Hannah), dies at age 79.
 September 23: Gene Day, Canadian comics artist (Star Wars, Master of Kung Fu) dies of a coronary while crossing a street. He is only around 30 years old.
 September 29: Marcel Turin, aka Mat, French comics artist, dies at age 86.

October
 October 3: Noel Sickles, American comics artist and illustrator (continued Scorchy Smith), passes away at age 72.

November
 November 8: Marco de Gastyne, French film director, illustrator and comics artist, dies at age 93.
 November 28: Manuel A. Martinez Parma, Argentine comic artist (Cosas de Negros, Alelí, Cristian), dies at age 72 or 73. 
 November 29: Robert Fuzier, French comics artist (Dédé et Doudou, Les Aventures de Pat'soum, Capitaine Passe-Partout, Cartouche), dies at age 83.

Specific date unknown
 Carl Lyon, Australian comics artist (Tootles, The Eagle, The Astounding Mr. Storm, Tim O'Hara), dies at age 78 or 79.
 Dan Noonan, American animator and comics artist (assisted on Pogo, made comics for Western Publishing), dies at age 71.
 H.E. Pease, British comics artist (Professor Jolly and his Magic Brolly, Cas of Cosnem's College, Tich the Tiny Tec), passes away at age 73 or 74.
 Eric Roberts, British comics artist (Helpful Henry, Dirty Dick, Winker Watson), passes away at age 72.

Awards

Eagle Awards 
Presented in 1983 for comics published in 1982: 
 Best Story: V for Vendetta, by Alan Moore and David Lloyd  (Warrior, Quality Communications)
 Best New Book: Teen Titans, by Marv Wolfman and George Pérez (DC Comics)
 Character Most Worthy of Own Title: Judge Anderson, 2000 AD (Fleetway)
 Best Comics Writer: Alan Moore, V for Vendetta (Warrior, Quality Communications)
 Favourite Artist: Bill Sienkiewicz
 Best UK Title: Warrior, edited by Dez Skinn
 Favourite Artist (UK): Brian Bolland

First issues by title

DC Comics 
Captain Carrot and His Amazing Zoo Crew!
 Release: March. Writer: Roy Thomas. Artists: Ross Andru, Scott Shaw, and Bob Smith

Daring New Adventures of Supergirl
 Release: November. Writer: Paul Kupperberg. Artists: Carmine Infantino and Bob Oksner

The Fury of Firestorm
 Release: June. Writer: Gerry Conway. Artists: Pat Broderick and Rodin Rodriguez.

Saga of the Swamp Thing
 Release: May. Writer: Martin Pasko. Artist: Thomas Yeates.

Limited series 
Atari Force: Promos distributed with Atari 2600 video games.
 Writers: Gerry Conway and Roy Thomas. Artists: Ross Andru, Mike DeCarlo, and Dick Giordano

Camelot 3000
 Release: December. Writer: Mike W. Barr. Artist: Brian Bolland

Marvel Comics 
Dreadstar
 Release: November by Epic Comics. Writer/Artist: Jim Starlin

G.I. Joe: A Real American Hero
 Release: June. Writer: Larry Hama. Artists: Herb Trimpe and Bob McLeod

Marvel Fanfare
 Release: March. Editor: Al Milgrom

Marvel Graphic Novel: "The Death of Captain Marvel"
 Release: January. Writer/Artist: Jim Starlin.

The Mighty World of Marvel vol. 2
 Release by Marvel UK: June. Editor: Dez Skinn.

Limited series 
Hercules
 Release: September.  Writer/Artist: Bob Layton.
Marvel Super Hero Contest of Champions
 Release: June. Writer: Mark Gruenwald. Artists John Romita, Jr. and Bob Layton.
The Vision and the Scarlet Witch
 Release: November.  Writer: Bill Mantlo.  Artists: Rick Leonardi, Ian Akin, and Brian Garvey.
Wolverine
 Release: September.  Writer: Chris Claremont.  Artists: Frank Miller and Josef Rubinstein.

Pacific Comics 
Alien Worlds
 Release: December. Editor: Bruce Jones

Ms. Mystic
 Release: October. Writer/Artist: Neal Adams

Starslayer: The Log of the Jolly Roger
 Release: February. Writer/Artist: Mike Grell

Twisted Tales
 Release: November. Editor: Bruce Jones

Other publishers 

Destroyer Duck
 Release: May by Eclipse Comics. Writer: Steve Gerber. Artist: Jack Kirby

Domino chance
Release: May by Chance Enterprises. Writer/Artist: Kevin Lenagh

Love and Rockets
 Release: June by Fantagraphics. Writers/Artists: Los Bros Hernandez

Primer
 Release: October by Comico.

Vortex
 Release: November by Vortex Comics. Editor: William P. Marks

Warrior
 Release: March by Quality Communications. Writer: Alan Moore. Artists: Garry Leach and Alan Davis

Initial appearances by character name

DC Comics 
Ambush Bug in DC Comics Presents #52 (December)
Arion in The Warlord #55 (March)
Komand'r in New Teen Titans #22 (August)
Brother Blood in New Teen Titans #21
Captain Carrot and His Amazing Zoo Crew! in New Teen Titans #16
Ch'p in Green Lantern #148
Firehawk in Firestorm #01 (June)
Global Guardians in DC Comics Presents #46
Hamilton Hill, in Detective Comics #511 (February)
Frances Kane in New Teen Titans #17 (March)
The Monitor, in New Teen Titans #21 (July)
Plastique in The Fury of Firestorm #07 (December)
The Psions in New Teen Titans #4
Terra in New Teen Titans #26 (December)
Ryand'r in Tales of the New Teen Titans #04 (September)
Adrian Chase in New Teen Titans #23 (September)
Myrra Rhodes in Weird War Tales #110 (April)
Black Bison in Firestorm #01 (June)
X'Hal in New Teen Titans #24 (October)
Alexander Luthor in DC Comics Presents Annual #01 (1982)
Baron Winters in New Teen Titans #21 (July)
Rubberduck in New Teen Titans #16 (February)
Invisible Kid in Legion of Super-Heroes Annual #01 (1982)
Salaak in Green Lantern #149 (February)
Captain Carrot in New Teen Titans #16 (February)
Fastback in New Teen Titans #16 (February)
Chameleon Girl in Legion of Super-Heroes #287 (May)
Rising Sun in DC Comics Presents #46 (June)
Helen Alexandros in Wonder Woman #288 (February)
Michael Beldon in New Teen Titans #20 (June)
Mirage in Detective Comics #511 (February)
Thunderlord in DC Comics Presents #46 (June)
Aristides Demetrios in DC Comics Presents #46 (June)
Lydea Mallor in Legion of Super-Heroes #290 (August)
Wanda Wayland in Justice League of America #203 (June)
Joseph Carny in Justice League of America #203 (June)
Mona Taylor in Justice League of America #203 (June)
Jack of Spades in Justice League of America #203 (June)
Jack Gold in New Teen Titans #21 (July)
Vanessa van Helsing in New Teen Titans #21 (July)
Donovan Caine in New Teen Titans #21 (July)
Bethany Snow in New Teen Titans #22 (August)
Bushmaster in DC Comics Presents #46 (June)
Alley-Kat-Abra in New Teen Titans #16 (February)
Yankee Poodle in New Teen Titans #16 (February)
Lord Damyn in New Teen Titans #24 (October)

Marvel Comics 
 The Acanti in  Uncanny X-Men #156
 Arcanna, in The Defenders #112 (October)
 The Brood in Uncanny X-Men #155
 Cloak and Dagger in Peter Parker, the Spectacular Spider-Man #64
 Luna, in Fantastic Four #240 (March)
 Marada, the She-Wolf, in Epic Illustrated #10 (Feb)
 New Mutants, in Marvel Graphic Novel #4: The New Mutants
 Cannonball
 Danielle Moonstar
 Sunspot
 Wolfsbane
 Nuke, in The Defenders #112 (October)
 Power Princess, in The Defenders #112 (October)
 Monica Rambeau in The Amazing Spider-Man Annual #16
 Sikorsky in Uncanny X-Men #156 (April)
 Obadiah Stane, in Iron Man #163 (October)
 William Stryker in X-Men: God Loves, Man Kills
 Varnae in Bizarre Adventures #33
 Vermin in Captain America #272
 Vertigo, in Marvel Fanfare #1 (March)
 Yukio in Wolverine #2

Other titles 
 Grendel in Primer #2, published by Comico
 Groo the Wanderer in Destroyer Duck #1, published by Eclipse Comics
 Marvelous Maureen, in Pep Comics #383 (Apr.), published by Archie Comics
 Ms. Mystic in Captain Victory and the Galactic Rangers #3, published by Pacific Comics
 Rocketeer in Starslayer #2, published by Pacific Comics
 The Warpsmiths in Warrior Summer Special #4, published by Quality Communications

References